In molecular biology, the sea anemone cytotoxic proteins are lethal pore-forming proteins, known collectively as actinoporins, a sub-class of cytolysins. There are several different groups of cytolysins based on their structure and function. This entry represents the most numerous group, the 20kDa highly basic peptides. These cytolysins form cation-selective pores in sphingomyelin-containing membranes. Examples include equinatoxins (from Actinia equina), sticholysins (from Stichodactyla helianthus), magnificalysins (from Heteractis magnifica), and tenebrosins (from Actinia tenebrosa), which exhibit pore-forming, haemolytic, cytotoxic, and heart stimulatory activities.

Cytolysins adopt a stable soluble structure, which undergoes a conformational change when brought in contact with a membrane, leading to an active, membrane-bound form that inserts spontaneously into the membrane. They often oligomerise on the membrane surface, before puncturing the lipid bilayers, causing the cell to lyse. The 20kDa sea anemone cytolysins require a phosphocholine lipid headgroup for binding, however sphingomyelin is required for the toxin to promote membrane permeability. The crystal structures of equinatoxin II  and sticholysin II  both revealed a compact beta-sandwich consisting of ten strands in two sheets flanked on each side by two short alpha-helices, which is a similar topology to osmotin. It is believed that the beta sandwich structure attaches to the membrane, while a three-turn alpha helix lying on the surface of the beta sheet may be involved in membrane pore formation, possibly by the penetration of the membrane by the helix.

References 

Protein families
Sea anemone toxins